Blackett Lake is a lake in Thunder Bay District, Ontario, Canada and the source of Blackett Creek.

References

Lakes of Thunder Bay District